Jerzy Solarz (12 February 1930 – 30 December 1984) was a Polish gymnast. He competed in eight events at the 1952 Summer Olympics.

References

1930 births
1984 deaths
Polish male artistic gymnasts
Olympic gymnasts of Poland
Gymnasts at the 1952 Summer Olympics
Sportspeople from Kraków